The women's futsal tournament at the 2017 Southeast Asian Games were held from 18 to 27 August in Malaysia. In this tournament, 5 Southeast Asian teams competed in the women's competition.

All matches were played at Panasonic Stadium in Shah Alam.

Competition schedule
The following was the competition schedule for the women's futsal competitions:

Participating nations
The following five teams participated for the competition.

  (INA)
  (MAS)
  (MYA)
  (THA)
  (VIE)

Match officials

Draw
There are no official draw since only 5 teams participating in this competition. All teams are automatically drawn to one group.

Competition format
Round robin; the team with the best record wins the gold medal.

Results 
All times are Malaysia Standard Time (UTC+8).

References

External links
Official website

Women's tournament
2017 in futsal